Guy La Chambre (June 5, 1898, in Paris – May 24, 1975) was a French politician. He served as Minister of Merchant Marine in 1934 and Minister of Air from 1938 until 1940.

Life 
Guy La Chambre was born on June 5, 1898 into a prosperous family with roots in Brittany. His father, Charles La Chambre served in the Chamber of Deputies representing Ille-et-Vilaine from 1902 to 1906, and Guy's grandfather Charles-Emile also served in that capacity from 1876 to 1881 and from 1889 to 1893.

Guy La Chambre was educated at the Lycée Condorcet and the Lycée Louis-le-Grand and studied law at the Sorbonne. In 1916 he enlisted as a volunteer in the French Army and served for the remainder of the First World War, being awarded the Croix de guerre 1914–1918 for his services. In the aftermath of the German defeat La Chambre served with the Allied occupation forces in the Rhineland. After completing his legal studies and being admitted to the bar, La Chambre was employed working in the private office of Prime Minister Aristide Briand.

At the 1928 general election, he stood successfully in Saint-Malo and held his seat in the 1932 and 1936 elections. He was Minister of Merchant Marine from January 30, 1934 – February 9, 1934.

He was appointed Minister of Air on January 18, 1938 and held the office until March 21, 1940.

He died on May 24, 1975.

Sources and further reading 
 Biography
 

1898 births
1975 deaths
Politicians from Paris
Independents of the Left politicians
Radical Party (France) politicians
National Centre of Independents and Peasants politicians
French Ministers of Merchant Marine
Government ministers of France
Members of the 14th Chamber of Deputies of the French Third Republic
Members of the 15th Chamber of Deputies of the French Third Republic
Members of the 16th Chamber of Deputies of the French Third Republic
Deputies of the 2nd National Assembly of the French Fourth Republic
Deputies of the 3rd National Assembly of the French Fourth Republic
French people of the Algerian War
Lycée Condorcet alumni
Lycée Louis-le-Grand alumni